Central Mamuju Regency is a regency in the province of West Sulawesi, Indonesia. The regency was established on 14 December 2012, comprising five regencies which had  formerly been part of Mamuju Regency. It covers an area of 3,100.87 km2 and had a population of 105,495 at the 2010 Census and 135,280 at the 2020 Census.

Administration 
The regency is divided into five districts (kecamatan), tabulated below with their areas and their populations at the 2010 Census and 2020 Census. The table also includes the locations of the district administrative centres.

Climate
Central Mamuju regency has a tropical rainforest climate (Af) with heavy rainfall year-round. The following climate data is for the town of Tobadak, the seat of the regency.

References

Regencies of West Sulawesi
2012 establishments in Indonesia